Cornwallville is a hamlet in the town of Durham, Greene County, New York, United States. The zipcode is: 12418. Its estimated population in 2018 was 408.

Notes

Hamlets in Greene County, New York
Hamlets in New York (state)